is a Japanese poet and critic. His works available in English translation include For the Fighting Spirit of the Walnut (2008) and The Guest Cat (2014), both published by New Directions.

References

1950 births
Living people
Japanese critics
International Writing Program alumni
20th-century Japanese poets